Angela Barrett (born 1955) is a British artist and illustrator. She has illustrated picture books, children's books and novels, including various fairytales.

Life and career
Barrett grew up sewing and drawing. She attended Thurrock Technical College and worked in retail display. She then attended Maidstone art school and later the Royal College of Art. Barrett's first illustrated book was The King, the Cat and the Fiddle, published in 1983 and written by Yehudi Menuhin and Christopher Hope.

In 2013, stamps depicting novels by Jane Austen were illustrated by Barrett and released by Royal Mail for the 200th anniversary of the novel Pride and Prejudice.

Style
Barrett's work is mainly created using watercolor, gouache, colored pencils, and ink. She is known for her period pieces and the research she applies to her work. For the 1998 book Joan of Arc, she researched 15th-century art and illuminated manuscripts to create a visual style for the story, using motifs inspired by medieval French fabrics. She uses photographs as reference for her compositions.

Barrett works in a realistic style with distorted figures, proportions and perspectives. Joanna Carey for The Guardian stated Barrett's illustrations have "a stillness and a quiet atmospheric intensity..." Valerie Coghlan stated in The Oxford Encyclopedia of Children's Literature that Barrett's "slightly elongated figures and faces and distorted perspective are frequently used to heighten tension and impart a sense of mystery."

Illustrated works
The King, the Cat and the Fiddle (1983), by Yehudi Menuhin and Christopher Hope
The Wild Swans (c. 1984) by Hans Christian Andersen
The Dragon wore Pink (1985) by Christopher Hope 
Through the Kitchen Window (c. 1986) by Susan Hill
The Snow Queen (1988) by Hans Christian Andersen, translated by Naomi Lewis
Proud Knight, Fair Lady: The Twelve Lays of Marie de France (1989), translated by Naomi Lewis
The Hidden House (1990)
Snow White (1991), retelling by Josephine Poole
Beware, Beware (1993), by Susan Hill
The Ice Palace (1994), by Angela McAllister
The Random House Book of Stories from the Ballet (1995) by Geraldine McCaughrean
The Emperor's New Clothes (1997), by Hans Christian Andersen, translated by Naomi Lewis
Joan of Arc (1998) by Josephine Poole
Rocking Horse Land and Other Classic Tales of Dolls and Toys (2000), by Hans Christian Andersen, compiled by Naomi Lewis
Through the Tempests Dark and Wild: a Story of Mary Shelley, Creator of Frankenstein (2003) by Sharon Darrow
Anne Frank (2005) by Josephine Poole
Beauty and the Beast (2006), retelling by Max Eilenberg
The Snow Goose (2007 edition), by Paul Gallico
Sylvie and the Songman (2009) by Tim Binding
The Night Fairy (2010) by Laura Amy Schlitz
The Most Wonderful Thing in the World? (2015), by Vivian French
The Restless Girls (2019) by Jessie Burton

Awards and honors
1991 W. H. Smith Illustration Award for The Hidden House by Martin Waddell
1993 Shortlist for the Kate Greenaway Medal for Beware, Beware! by Susan Hill
1998 Nestlé Smarties Book Prize for Can It Be True?

References

1955 births
Living people
20th-century British women artists
21st-century British women artists
British illustrators
British women illustrators
British children's book illustrators
Alumni of the Royal College of Art
Watercolorists
Women watercolorists